Marble is the second EP by Japanese rock band Fanatic Crisis. It was released by the independent label Noir on November 25, 1996. The first edition was housed in a plastic sleeve containing a box showing fake prescription pills which say, "Now, you must look for some more stimulants."

Track listing

Personnel 
Tsutomu Ishizuki − vocals, drums
Kazuya − lead guitar
Shun − rhythm guitar
Ryuji − bass

References

Fanatic Crisis albums
1996 albums